Krakowski (feminine: Krakowska; plural: Krakowscy) is a Polish surname. It is a toponymic surname referring to the city of Kraków and environs. It appears in various forms in other languages.

Related surnames

People 
 Kolowrat-Krakowsky, historic family from Central Europe
 Count Sascha Kolowrat-Krakowsky
 Feldmarschall Johann Karl, Graf von Kolowrat-Krakowsky
 Alois Josef Krakovský z Kolovrat (1759–1833), Czech Catholic archbishop
 Andrzej Krakowski (born 1946), Polish-American filmmaker
 Emilia Krakowska (born 1940), Polish actress
 Jane Krakowski (born 1968), American actress
 Joe Krakauskas (1915–1960), Canadian baseball player
 Serhiy Krakovskyi (born 1960), Ukrainian footballer
 Solomon Krakovsky (1922–2016), American actor better known as Steven Hill
 Shmuel Krakowski (1926–2018), Polish-Israeli historian
 Wolf Krakowski (born 1947), Canadian Yiddish-speaking musician

Other
 Krakowska, type of Polish sausage (kielbasa)
 Obwarzanek krakowski, braided ring-shaped bread
 Galeria Krakowska, shopping mall in Kraków
 Gazeta Krakowska, largest regional daily newspaper in Kraków
 Opera Krakowska
 Krakowska Street in Bydgoszcz

See also
 
 
 Krakouer (disambiguation)
 Kraków County (powiat krakowski), an administrative division adjoining Kraków in southern Poland

Polish-language surnames
Polish toponymic surnames